Copa de la Reina de Water polo is the second most important competition of female water polo played in Spain. Inaugural edition was played in 1997. The best eight teams in the first round of the regular season dispute the trophy on February in a final-eight format.

Winners by year

Wins by teams

See also
División de Honor Femenina
Supercopa de España

References

External links
Royal Spanish Swimming Federation